Big Brother Naija 2017, also known as Big Brother Naija: See Gobbe is the second season of the Nigerian version of the reality show Big Brother. It was launched on 22 January 2017 and is slated to end after 78 days. Ex-housemate Ebuka Obi-Uchendu from season one as the host. Two fake housemates, Jon Ogah and Ese Eriata were introduced halfway into the show to spice things up.

Housemates

Nominations table

Notes

 Jon and Ese were Fake Housemates, they can nominate but cannot be nominated.
 : Housemates were announced that they would be competing for "likes" and the two housemates with the least amount of them would be evicted. However, this task only existed for housemates to know each other and no one will be evicted but instead, two more housemates will be joining later.
 : Fake nominations with housemates nominating to save. If the eviction went ahead, TBoss, CoColce, Kemen, Bally and Marvis would have faced the public vote.
 : Bassey and Debie-Rise were exempt, as they were new housemates.
 : The Head of House title was given to Efe on Day 9, but he still facing eviction.
 : This week, two fake housemates entered the house. They are Jon and Ese. Ese won the Head of House title. Later, she saved TBoss and nominate Marvis for eviction.
 : This week, all housemates' nominations were cancelled by Big Brother. He would decide who would be evicted on Sunday night.
 : Kemen was ejected from the house after inappropriately touching TBoss. His votes were voided, so Uriel was evicted.
 : Marvis was able to directly nominate one housemate with her Power Card. She Nominated Debie-Rise.
 : As Head of House this week, Efe would be the only housemate to nominate.
 : For the final week the public were voting for who they wanted to win, rather than to save.

References

External links 
 Official site

Nigeria
2017 Nigerian television seasons